Wornell Jones (born November 14) is an American bassist. He has performed with many people and groups in the United States and Japan, including likes of Sly and the Family Stone, Koko Taylor, Chage and Aska, Hiromi Go, and Omega Tribe.

He is sometimes given the nickname "The Sonic Prince" from the live album Night After Night by Nils Lofgren, which he participated in.

Biography 
Jones was born in Washington, D.C. and grew up in one of its neighborhoods. He started playing with the Palatons before going into various clubs and playing with blues musicians, including guitarist Bobby Parker. He started venturing into playing in studio sessions via one of the Bon Jovi brothers.

Jones became a member of the Young Senators in the 70's, being the bassist for their debut single "Jungle" in 1971. In 1972, the band joined singer Eddie Kendricks as his backing band as well as his recording band for People ... Hold On released that same year.

In 1975, Jones helped with Nils Lofgren's debut album Nils Lofgren. In 1977, he was hired to play bass for Lofgren's fourth studio album, I Came to Dance as his suggestions in 1976 and 1977 led to the creation of the album. In 1979, he released his self-titled debut album, which was popular in the United Kingdom. Maxayn Lewis, a backing singer, participated in the album and would later be with Jones in Omega Tribe.

In the early 80's, he moved to Japan. In 1987, Jones became the bassist for 1986 Omega Tribe after their previous backing bassist, Shigeru Watanabe, left. He met with fellow backing members Marty Bracey and Teruo Gotō and continued playing with the band until their disbandment in 1991.

In 2015, Jones, along with Bracey, Gotō, Tomoharu Hani and Nishiyama "Hank" Fumio, formed the jazz band B-EDGE. On November 11, 2015, they released their debut album Easy Loving You, which included a single with former Psy-S singer Mami "Chaka" Yasunori. From 2017 to 2019, Carlos Toshiki temporarily joined the band for tours as the lead vocalist, and they renamed themselves Carlos Toshiki & B-EDGE. After the Tour Final de Verão 2019, Toshiki returned to Brazil and the band kept playing gigs at clubs. They released their third album Meteo on March 11, 2020.

Discography

Studio albums

Extended plays

Singles

External links 
Jones's Website

References 

Omega Tribe (Japanese band) members
American bass guitarists